An election to Ceredigion County Council was held on 10 June 2004 on the same day of the European Elections. It was preceded by the 1999 election and followed by the 2008 election.

The whole council was up for election and following boundary changes the number of seats was reduced to 42. The council remained in a situation of No Overall Control following Plaid Cymru gains at the expense of the Independents. The Independents formed a coalition administration following the previous county council election in May 1999, being largest group on the council along with the Liberal Democrats.

After the election, the composition of the council was:
 Independents 16
Plaid Cymru 16
Liberal Democrats 9
Labour 1

Election results: overview
Sixteen members of the original Council elected in 1995 were again returned.

Three of the elected Independent councilors, namely Gethin James (Aberporth), Ray Quant (Borth) and Haydn Lewis (Penparc) were non-party Independents, in that they did not sit as members of the Independent group of councilors.

|-bgcolor=#F6F6F6
| colspan=2 style="text-align: right; margin-right: 1em" | Total
| style="text-align: right;" | 42
| colspan=2 |
| style="text-align: right;" | -2
| colspan=2 |
| style="text-align: right;" | 26,205
| style="text-align: right;" | 
|-
|}

1Cymraeg/Welsh was the label used by independent councillor John Ivor Williams. In 1999, and again in 2008, he ran with the label Independent.
2Llais Aberaeron UDP Reject was the label used by Mary Elizabeth Davies.

Ward Results

Aberaeron (one seat)

Aberporth (one seat)

Aberteifi, Mwldan (one seat)

Aberteifi, Rhydyfuwch (one seat)
Boundary Change.

Aberteifi, Teifi (one seat)
Boundary Change.

Aberystwyth Bronglais (one seats)
Boundary Change

Aberystwyth Central (one seat)
Boundary Change

Aberystwyth North (one seat)
Possible Boundary Change

Aberystwyth Penparcau (two seats)

This ward was previously known as Aberystwyth South

Aberystwyth Rheidol (one seat)

Beulah (one seat)

Borth (one seat)

Capel Dewi (one seat)

Ceulanamaesmawr (one seat)

Ciliau Aeron (one seat)

Faenor (one seat)

Lampeter (two seats)

Llanarth (one seat)

Llanbadarn Fawr Padarn (one seat)
Boundary Change

Llanbadarn Fawr Sulien (one seat)
Boundary Change

Llandyfriog (one seat)

Llandysiliogogo (one seat)

Llandysul Town (one seat)

Llanfarian (one seat)
Alun Lloyd Jones had left the Plaid Cymru group and joined the Independents after the 1999 election.

Llanfihangel Ystrad (one seat)

Llangeitho (one seat)

Llangybi (one seat)

Llanrhystud (one seat)

Llansantffraed (one seat)

Llanwenog (one seat)

Lledrod (one seat)

Melindwr (one seat)

New Quay (one seat)

Penbryn (one seat)
Plaid Cymru had won the seat in a by-election.

Penparc (one seat)

Tirymynach (one seat)

Trefeurig (one seat)

Tregaron (one seat)

Troedyraur (one seat)

Ystwyth one seat)

References

2004 Welsh local elections
2004
21st century in Ceredigion